This article lists the confirmed national futsal squads for the 2007 UEFA Futsal Championship tournament held in Portugal.

External links
UEFA.com

UEFA Futsal Championship squads
Squads